Ludwig Hirschfeld Mack (11 July 1893, in Frankfurt-am-Main – 7 January 1965, in Allambie Heights, in Sydney) was a German-born Australian artist.

His formative education was 1912–1914 at Debschitz art school in Munich. He studied at the Bauhaus from 1919–24 and remained working there until 1926 where, along with Kurt Schwerdtfeger, he further developed the Farblichtspiele ('coloured-light-plays'), which used a projection device to produced moving colours on a transparent screen accompanied by music composed by Hirschfeld Mack. It is now regarded as an early form of multimedia. He was a participant, along with the former Bauhaus master Gertrud Grunow, in den II. Kongreß für Farbe-Ton-Forschung (Hamburg 1. - 5. Oktober 1930) (English: Second Congress for Colour-Sound Research, Hamburg). In 1923 he participated in the prestigious film festival "Der Absolute Film in Berlin with other film producers such as Hans Richter Viking Eggeling, Walter Ruttmann, Fernand Léger. Francis Picabia and Renée Clair. Music and colour theory remained lifelong interests, informing his art work in a number of media, and it was the inspiration for his well-respected and influential teaching.

Life
Ludwig Hirschfeld Mack was born in Frankfurt am Main where he grew up. He attended the Musterschule, a progressive Frankfurt high school for musically gifted children, which still exists today. He was later taught by Hermann Obrist and Wilhelm von Debschitz in Munich, taking art history with Heinrich Wölfflin and Fritz Burger. During the First World War, Ludwig Hirschfeld Mack was an infantry officer.

Bauhaus
Hirschfeld Mack completed a craftsman apprenticeship at his father's leather factory before studying at the Teaching and Experimental Studios for Applied and Free Art under Hermann Obrist and Wilhelm von Debschitz in Munich in 1912. He then enrolled at the University of Munich and attended lectures in art history by Heinrich Wölfflin and Fritz Burger. In 1919 he went to study at the Art Academy in Stuttgart under Adolf Hölzel (colour theory) and Ida Kerkovius, but later the same year enrolled at the Bauhaus, where he studied under Johannes Itten, Paul Klee and Wassily Kandinsky, and was apprenticed to Lyonel Feininger in the print workshop, obtaining a Bauhaus graduate diploma in lithography in 1924. When Itten did not offer a course devoted to colour at the Bauhaus, Hirschfeld-Mack offered to conduct a colour course during the winter semester of 1922/23. While this course was not officially recognised, it was at times attended by Masters Kandisky and Klee.

He remained at the Weimar Bauhaus until its closure in 1925 and conducted experiments in light projection, following German sculptor Kurt Schwerdtfeger (1897–1966) in developing the "Farbenlichtspiele" (colour-light play), producing an apparatus that combined moving projections of coloured light through mechanically operable geometric stencils displayed to music created by Ludwig himself. Its first performance was at the Bauhaus Lantern Festival 21 June 1922. Ludwig described the kinetic projection as "fugue-like, strictly structured plays of colour, always derived from a definite colour-form theme".

In 1963, Hans Maria Wingler, the director of the newly established Bauhaus Archiv in Darmstadt, Germany, invited Ludwig to reconstruct his colour light plays, which required him to reconstruct the apparatus and rewrite the scores from his notes and his memory as well as prepare the music for the performance at the Bauhaus Archiv in Darmstadt. In early 1964 he and his second wife Olive departed for Europe and spent some time in Darmstadt training assistants for the performance. With the assistance of sponsors, a film of the black and white play Kreuzspiel was subsequently made by the trained assistants after his death and two copies of this film remain. In 2000 under the direction and assistance of Hirschfeld-Mack's grandson Kaj Delugan performances of the plays were filmed in colour by Corinne Schweizer and Peter Böhm with a musical sound-track for the 2000 Exhibition in Bolzano, Italy.

Further teaching
In 1926, Hirschfeld Mack began teaching art in the Free School in Wickersdorf in Thuringa.  In 1929 he was appointed as a teacher of colour and general morphology at the Bauhochschule University of Craft and Architecture in Weimar. The school was established in Weimar after the Bauhaus left in 1925, and reopen in Dessau in 1926. In 1930 the director Otto Bartning was replaced by Paul Schlze-Naumberg, an advocate of Nazi architecture, resulting in the dismissal of most of the staff.  He then became professor at the Pedagogical Academy in Frankfurt (Oder) until its closure in 1932. He taught at the Teacher Training Academy in Kiel in northern Germany from 1932 until it too was closed by the Nazis in 1933. He moved in April 1933 to Berlin where he was able to obtain casual employment teaching the construction of musical instruments at the Jöde-Schule/Güntherschule and other institutes. Hirschfeld Mack had married Elenor Wirth in 1917 and her father had established an acquaintance with the a member of the Clark family, who were members of the Quakers (Society of Friends) in England. After realising that his part Jewish Heritage made it impossible to obtain any permanent employment, Hirschfeld-Mack left Germany in early 1936 boundfor Britain in search of permanent employment.

United Kingdom
Upon arrival Hirschfeld Mack spent some time in Haselmere in Surrey before moving to London, where he was eventually offered employment under the Quaker Subsistence Program, which aimed to teach unemployed miners in Wales new skills, where he was in charge of the carpentry workshop. After returning to Germany to finalise his papers and spending some time in a carpentry workshop, he returned to England to commence his employment in Cwmavon, Wales in the Eastern Valley of Monmouthshire in South Wales around May 1936. Elenor (d.1953) remained in Germany with the two youngest daughters, while his eldest, Marga, followed him into English exile. Sadly his second daughter Ursel (17) died by suicide in April 1938. The Museum of Modern Art, New York, included his work in its Bauhaus retrospective of 1938

Australia
In 1940 Hirschfeld Mack was deported to Australia as an enemy alien on the ship HMT Dunera, spending time in internment camps in Hay, Orange and Tatura, before being granted Australian citizenship. Imprisonment and the longing for freedom were the theme of his small, stark, poignant relief prints of this period, including the woodcut Desolation, Internment Camp, Hay 1941. He was mentor to other internees including Erwin Fabian. His release from detention was secured in April 1942 through the intercession of Dr J.R. Darling, principal of Geelong Church of England Grammar School in Victoria, who appointed Hirschfeld Mack as the Art master. "Dr Hirschfeld", as he was known, and as recorded by one of his pupils the prominent curator David Thomas, was held in high regard by students and staff alike, and proved to be an inspirational teacher, consistently propounding the Bauhaus principles of self-knowledge, economy of material and form, and reform of society through art. Hirschfeld introduced the boys to such things as colour-coded guitars and colour 'organs' and in 1965 some of the instruments were donated to the 'Occupational Centre for Mental Handicapped Children' in Geelong.

Recognition
Hirschfeld was amongst a number of European wartime refugees who contributed to the renewal of Australian Art. As Professor Joseph Burke then Professor of Fine Arts, Melbourne University, notes in 1954: "Among the leaders of this "New Australian" contribution may be mentioned Desiderius Orban (b. 1884), a distinguished painter whose teaching has made a profound mark in Sydney in the post-war years; Dr. Ludwig Hirschfeld-Mack, an original member of the Bauhaus staff, a close colleague and friend of Paul Klee, whose work has influenced his own highly original abstract paintings; Sali Herman (b. 1898), and the recent winner of the Blake Prize for religious art, Michael Kmit, from the Ukraine.

Hirschfeld was also a guest lecturer at the University of Melbourne, where he had his first exhibition in Australia in the Rowden White Library in 1946, possibly organised by fellow Dunera passenger Franz Philipp, and in the same year his work was included in group exhibitions of the Contemporary Art Society (CAS) in Sydney and in Melbourne during its most radical period under John Reed (art patron). He showed also at the Peter Bray Gallery in Melbourne, in 1953.

In 1949–1950, 1958 and 1964 he visited Europe. When Walter Gropius came to lecture at the Royal Australian Institute of Architects convention in Sydney in 1954 he made a special trip to Geelong Grammar School to visit his former colleague.

In 1955 Hirschfeld married Miss Olive Russell, a leading Quaker whom he had met at Tatura, and teacher of social studies at the Melbourne Church of England Girls Grammar School. In 1957 he retired from Geelong Grammar School and they moved to Ferny Creek, Victoria.

In 1960, Clement Meadmore selected works from Hirschfeld Mack's own collection to curate the first significant exhibition of Bauhaus ideas and work in Australia, "The Bauhaus - Aspects and Influences", at Gallery A in Melbourne (July–August 1961). Included were Hirschfeld Mack's own works and colour-coded musical instruments and proof prints he had made for other Bauhaus artists as well as numbers of works given to him during his period at the Bauhaus. After Hirschfeld Mack's death, Gallery A held a commemorative exhibition of his watercolours.

Ludwig Hirschfeld Mack died on 7 January 1965 at Allambie Heights, a suburb of Sydney.

Exhibitions
 Work represented in Bauhaus: 1919-1925 MOMA New York 1938
 University of Melbourne, 1946
Solo exhibition Peter Bray Gallery, 435 Bourke St., Melbourne, Victoria, Australia, 1953
Memorial exhibition at University Gallery Melbourne, 1981
The Great Australian Art Exhibition 1788-1988 Art Gallery of South Australia, 1988
  Bauhaus Centenary: Ludwig Hirschfeld Mack, Feb 23, 2019–May 26, 2019 Geelong Gallery, 55 Little Malop Street, Geelong

Publications
He produced an explanatory text of the Farbenlichtspiele in 1923, also an article, "Reflected-Light Compositions…" (1925)
In retirement in 1963 he published The Bauhaus: An Introductory Survey.

The Ludwig Hirschfeld Mack Collection 

The Ludwig Hirschfeld Mack Collection was presented Melbourne University in 1971 and 1980 by Hirschfeld Mack's widow, Olive Hirschfeld. The collection contains over six hundred works by Hirschfeld Mack, including almost three hundred drawings, over two hundred prints, ninety-one watercolours and sixty-nine paintings. In addition the University of Melbourne Archives houses material including correspondence, teaching aids, drawings, photographs and slides.

Olive Hirschfeld also donated a collection of her late husband's paintings, prints and drawings to the National Gallery of Australia, and a number of his works, many from his internment at nearby Tatura, can be found at the Geelong and Shepparton Regional Art Galleries.

The Hirschfeld-Mack Professorship in Germany and Australia

In 2008, the Institute of English Philology at the Free University of Berlin (Institut für Englische Philologie der Freien Universität Berlin (FU)) set up a Ludwig Hirschfeld-Mack Visiting Chair of Australian Studies The professorship is named after Hirschfeld-Mack, "to stress the interdisciplinary nature of its teachers, their commitment to the role of culture in the public sphere, and the central transcultural German-Australian aspect of the project."  The chair is funded by the German Academic Exchange Service (DAAD) and the Australian Embassy in Berlin.

Hirschfeld-Mack professors in Berlin included: Dr. Stephen Muecke, Professor of Cultural Studies at the University of Technology Sydney; Dr. Philip Mead, Professor of Australian Literature at the University of Western Australia; Dr. Devleena Ghosh, Associate Professor in Arts and Sciences at the University of Technology Sydney; Dr. Lynn McCredden, Professor of Literary Studies at Deakin University; Dr. Simon During, Australian Professorial Fellow at the University of Queensland; Dr. Anna Haebich, Distinguished Professor of Human Rights Education at Curtin University; Dr. Peter Otto, Professor of English and Theatre at the University of Melbourne;Dr. Chandani Lokuge, Associate Professor in Creative Writing at Monash University; Dr. Verity Burgmann, Professor of Political Science at the University of Melbourne; and Dr. Andrew Milner, Professor of English and Comparative Literature at Monash University.

In 2010 DAAD established, in the reverse direction, a Hirschfeld-Mack Visiting Chair for German Studies at the German Department at the University of Western Australia. Through this reciprocal visiting professor program the exchange between the Australian and German higher education system is intensified. The first Hirschfeld-Mack professors in Perth were the Germanists Dr. Matthias N. Lorenz, University of Bielefeld (2010), and Prof. Dr. Sven Kramer, University of Lüneburg (2011).

Further reading
Art and Australia, 30, no 4, 1993, p 518
Bate, W. (1990) Light Blue Down Under. Melbourne
Böhm, Peter; Schweizer, Corrinne (Directors). Farben Licht Spiele: Reconstruction 2000. DVD-Video, PAL, stereo, dur. 45 min. (Film of a reconstruction of Hirschfeld Mack's light playing apparatus.)
Frances Derham MBE : a retrospective exhibition covering the period 1910 to 1985 and including works by her associates: Mary Cecil Allen, George Bell, Danila Vassilieff, Geoff Jones, Ethel Spowers, Ludwig Hirschfeld-Mack. East Malvern, Vic. : Jim Alexander Gallery, 1986.
Draffin, Nicholas (1974) Two masters of the Weimar Bauhaus :Lyonel Feininger, Ludwig Hirschfeld Mack  [Sydney] : Trustees of the Art Gallery of New South Wales,.   .
Elsen, G. (1990) The Dunera Experience, exhibition catalogue, Jewish Museum of Australia. Melbourne :
Form (Cambridge, England), 2, Sept 1966, p 10
Hapkemeyer, Andreas/Stasney, Peter (Eds.), (2000) Ludwig Hirschfeld-Mack. Bauhaus and visionary. Hatje Cantz Verlag, OstfildernRuit, ., 
Merewether, Charles, (1984), Art and Social Commitment, Sydney, NSW : Art Gallery of New South Wales.
McNamara, Andrew (2008) 'The Bauhaus in Australia', in Ann Stephen, Philip Goad, and Andrew McNamara, Modern Times: The Untold Story of Modernism in Australia, Melbourne 2008, 215. 
McCulloch, A., (1984), Encyclopedia of Australian Art, Melbourne, Vic (Second edition)
Hirschfeld-Mack, Ludwig, (1963) The Bauhaus : an introductory survey; with a foreword by Walter Gropius, introduction by Joseph Burke, epilogue by Sir Herbert Read. Croydon, Vic. : Longmans Green
Pearl, C. (1983) The Dunera Scandal. Sydney :
Renowden, F. & Schwarzbauer, R. (2006) The Bauhaus Legacy at GGS. Works designed and inspired or created by Ludwig Hirschfield Mack (1893–1965), Art Master 1942-1957.
Seear, Lynne &  Ewington, Julie (eds.)(1998) Brought to light: Australian art 1850–1965 : from the Queensland Art Gallery collection. South Brisbane : Queensland Art Gallery.
Stasny, Peter (1991) Ludwig Hirschfeld-Mack, Künstler, Kunsttheoretiker und Kunstpädagoge im Gefolge des Weimarer Bauhaus (PhD thesis, University of Vienna).
Stephen, Ann, Goad, Philip and McNamara, Andrew (eds.) Modern times : the untold story of modernism in Australia. Carlton, Vic. : Miegunyah Press ; Sydney, N.S.W. : in association with Powerhouse Publishing, 2008.
Thomas, Daniel & Radford, Ron, (1988), The Great Australian Art Exhibition, CAT.
Underhill, N. (1977) Ludwig Hirschfeld Mack, exhibition catalogue, Brisbane.
Schwarzbauer, Resi, with Bell, Chris (2021) Ludwig Hirschfeld-Mack, More Than A Bauhaus Artist HistorySmiths Pty Ltd, ACN 082 919 480, ISBN 978-0-6489574-1-6.

References

External links
Bauhaus100.Ludwig Hirschfeld-Mack

1893 births
1965 deaths
Australian painters
20th-century German painters
20th-century German male artists
German male painters
People educated at the Musterschule
Bauhaus alumni
Refugees in Australia
Australian printmakers
German printmakers
20th-century printmakers
German emigrants to Australia
German people of Jewish descent
20th-century German printmakers
People interned during World War II
Geelong Grammar School